The administrative posts (former subdistricts) of East Timor are subdivided into 442 sucos ("villages") and 2,336 aldeias ("communities").

List of sucos by municipality

Aileu Municipality

 Aileu Administrative Post
 Suco Aisirimou
 Suco Bandudatu
 Suco Fahiria
 Suco Fatubosa
 Suco Hoholau
 Suco Lahae
 Suco Lausi
 Suco Liurai
 Suco Malere
 Suco Saboria
 Suco Seloi Kraik
 Laulara Administrative Post
 Suco Fatisi
 Suco Kotolau
 Suco Madabeno
 Suco Talitu
 Suco Tohumeta
 Lequidoe Administrative Post
 Suco Acubilitoho
 Suco Bereleu
 Suco Betulau
 Suco Fahisoi
 Suco Fautrilau
 Suco Manukasa
 Suco Namleso
 Remexio Administrative Post
 Suco Acumau
 Suco Fadabloko
 Suco Fahisoi
 Suco Faturasa
 Suco Hautuho
 Suco Liurai
 Suco Maumeta
 Suco Tulatakeu

Ainaro Municipality

 Ainaro Administrative Post
 Suco Ainaro
 Suco Cassa
 Suco Manutassi
 Suco Mau-Nunu
 Suco Mau-Ulo
 Suco Soro
 Suco Suro-Craic
 Hato-Udo Administrative Post
 Suco Beikala
 Suco Leolima
 Hatu-Builico Administrative Post
 Suco Mulo
 Suco Mauchiga
 Suco Nunu Mogue
 Maubisse Administrative Post
 Suco Aituto
 Suco Edi
 Suco Fatubessi
 Suco Horiauic
 Suco Liurai
 Suco Manelobas
 Suco Manetu
 Suco Maubisse
 Suco Maulau

Atauro Municipality
 Atauro Administrative Post
 Suco Beloi
 Suco Biqueli
 Suco Macadade
 Suco Maquili
 Suco Vila

Baucau Municipality

 Baguia Administrative Post
 Suco Afaloicai
 Suco Alaua-Craik
 Suco Alaua-Leten
 Suco Defa-Uassi
 Suco Hae-Coni
 Suco Larisula
 Suco Lavateri
 Suco Osso-Huna
 Suco Samalari
 Suco Uacala
 Baucau Administrative Post
 Suco Bahú
 Suco Bucoli
 Suco Buibau
 Suco Buruma
 Suco Caibada Uaimua
 Suco Samalari
 Suco Seiçal
 Suco Tirilolo
 Suco Triloka
 Suco Gariuai
 Suco Uailili
 Laga Administrative Post
 Suco Atelari
 Suco Libagua
 Suco Nunira
 Suco Saelari
 Suco Sagadate
 Suco Samalari
 Suco Soba
 Suco Tequinaumata
 Quelicai Administrative Post
 Suco Abafala
 Suco Abo
 Suco Afaçá
 Suco Baguia
 Suco Bualale
 Suco Guruça
 Suco Lacoliu
 Suco Laisorulai de baixo
 Suco Laisorulai de cima
 Suco Lelalai
 Suco Letemumo
 Suco Macalaco
 Suco Maluro
 Suco Namanei
 Suco Uaitame
 Vemasse Administrative Post
 Suco Caicua
 Suco Loilubo
 Suco Ossoala
 Suco Ostico
 Suco Uaigae
 Suco Uatu-Lari
 Suco Vemasse
 Venilale Administrative Post
 Suco Bado-Ho’o
 Suco Bahamori
 Suco Fatulia
 Suco Uailaha
 Suco Uai-Oli
 Suco Uatu-Haco
 Suco Uma-Anaico
 Suco Uma Analu

Bobonaro Municipality

 Atabae Administrative Post
 Suco Aidabaleten
 Suco Atabai
 Suco Rairobo
 Suco Hataz
 Balibo Administrative Post
 Suco Balibo Kota
 Suco Batugade
 Suco Cová
 Suco Leohitu
 Suco Leolima
 Suco Sanirin
 Bobonaro Administrative Post
 Suco Ai-Assa
 Suco Atu Aben
 Suco Bobonaro
 Suco Carabau
 Suco Colimau
 Suco Cota Bo’ot
 Suco Ilatalaun
 Suco Leber
 Suco Lour
 Suco Lourba
 Suco Maliubu
 Suco Malilait
 Suco Molop
 Suco Oe-Leu
 Suco Sibuni
 Suco Soi Leco
 Suco Tapo
 Suco Tebabui
 Cailaco Administrative Post
 Suco Atudara
 Suco Daudo
 Suco Goulolo
 Suco Guenolai
 Suco Manapa
 Suco Miligo
 Suco Purogoa
 Suco Raiheu
 Lolotoe Administrative Post
 Suco Deudet
 Suco Gildapil
 Suco Guda
 Suco Lebos
 Suco Lontas
 Suco Lupai
 Suco Opa
 Maliana Administrative Post
 Suco Holsa
 Suco Lahomea
 Suco Odamau
 Suco Rai Fun
 Suco Ritabou
 Suco Saburai
 Suco Tapo Memo

Cova Lima Municipality

 Fatululic Administrative Post
 Suco Fatululic
 Suco Taroman
 Fatumean Administrative Post
 Suco Beluluik Leten
 Suco Fatumea
 Suco Nanu
 Fohorem Subdistrict
 Suco Dato Rua
 Suco Dato Tolu
 Suco Fohoren
 Suco Lactos
 Zumalai Administrative Post
 Suco Beco II
 Suco Fatuleto
 Suco Lepo
 Suco Lour
 Suco Mape
 Suco Raimera
 Suco Ucecai
 Suco Zulo
 Maucatar Administrative Post
 Suco Belecasac
 Suco Holpilat
 Suco Matai
 Suco Ogues
 Suai Administrative Post
 Suco Beco I
 Suco Debos
 Suco Labarat
 Suco Kamenasa
 Suco Suai Loro
 Tilomar Administrative Post
 Suco Beiseuc
 Suco Casabauc
 Suco Lalawa
 Suco Maudemo

Dili Municipality

 Cristo Rei Administrative Post
 Suco Ailok
 Suco Balibar
 Suco Becora
 Suco Bidau Santana
 Suco Camea
 Suco Kulu Hun
 Suco Hera
 Suco Meti Aut
 Dom Aleixo Administrative Post
 Suco Bairro Pite
 Suco Bebonuk
 Suco Comoro
 Suco Fatuhada
 Suco Kampung Alor
 Suco Madohi
 Suco Manleu-Ana
 Metinaro Administrative Post
 Suco Mantelolão
 Suco Sabuli
 Suco Wenunuc
 Nain Feto Administrative Post
 Suco Akadiru-Hun
 Suco Bemori
 Suco Bidau Lecidere
 Suco Gricenfor (fusion of former sucos of Bairro Central, Bairro dos Grilhos and Bairro Formosa)
 Suco Lahane Oriental
 Suco Santa Cruz
 Vera Cruz Administrative Post
 Suco Caicoli
 Suco Colmera
 Suco Dare
 Suco Lahane Ocidental
 Suco Mascarenhas
 Suco Motael
 Suco Vila Verde

Ermera Municipality

 Atsabe Administrative Post
 Suco Atara
 Suco Baboe Kraik
 Suco Baboe Leten
 Suco Batu Manu
 Suco Laklo
 Suco Lasaun
 Suco Laubonu
 Suco Leimea Leten
 Suco Malabe
 Suco Obulo
 Suco Parami
 Suco Tiarlelo
 Ermera Administrative Post
 Suco Estado
 Suco Humboe
 Suco Lauala
 Suco Liguimea
 Suco Mertutu
 Suco Poetete
 Suco Ponilala
 Suco Raimerhei
 Suco Riheu
 Suco Talimoro
 Hatulia Administrative Post
 Suco Ailelo
 Suco Asulau/Sare
 Suco Fatubalu
 Suco Fatubessi
 Suco Hatulia
 Suco Kailete Leotela
 Suco Leimea Kraik
 Suco Leimea Sarinbala
 Suco Lisabat
 Suco Manusea
 Suco Mauabu
 Suco Samara
 Suco Uruhau
 Letefoho Administrative Post
 Suco Dukurai
 Suco Eraulo
 Suco Goulolo
 Suco Hatugau
 Suco Katrai Kraik
 Suco Katrai Leten
 Suco Lauana
 Suco Letefoho
 Railaco Administrative Post
 Suco Fatuquero
 Suco Liho
 Suco Matata
 Suco Oeleso
 Suco Railaco Kraik
 Suco Railako Leten
 Suco Samaleten
 Suco Taraso
 Suco Tokoluli

Lautém Municipality

 Iliomar Administrative Post
 Suco Iliomar I
 Suco Iliomar II
 Suco Ailebere
 Suco Fuat
 Suco Cainliu
 Suco Tirilolo
 Lautém Administrative Post
 Suco Baduro
 Suco Com
 Suco Daudere
 Suco Eukisi
 Suco Ililai
 Suco Maina I
 Suco Maina II
 Suco Pairara
 Suco Parlamento
 Suco Serelau
 Lospalos Administrative Post
 Suco Bauro
 Suco Cacavei
 Suco Fuiloro
 Suco Home
 Suco Leuro
 Suco Loré I
 Suco Loré II
 Suco Muapitine
 Suco Raça
 Suco Souro
 Luro Administrative Post
 Suco Afabubu
 Suco Baricafa
 Suco Cotamuto
 Suco Lakawa
 Suco Luro
 Suco Wairoke
 Tutuala Administrative Post
 Suco Mehara
 Suco Tutuala

Liquiçá Municipality

 Bazartete Administrative Post
 Suco Fahilebo
 Suco Fatumasi
 Suco Lauhata
 Suco Leorema
 Suco Maumeta
 Suco Metagou
 Suco Motaulun
 Suco Tibar
 Suco Ulmera
 Liquiçá Administrative Post
 Suco Asumano
 Suco Darulete
 Suco Dato
 Suco Hatukesi
 Suco Leotela
 Suco Loidahar
 Suco Lukulai
 Maubara Administrative Post
 Suco Guguleur
 Suco Guico
 Suco Lisadilia
 Suco Maubaralisa
 Suco Vatuboro
 Suco Vatuvou
 Suco Vaviquinia

Manatuto Municipality

 Barique Administrative Post
 Suco Aubeon
 Suco Barique
 Suco Fatuwaqui
 Suco Manehat
 Suco Sikone-Diloli
 Suco Umaboku
 Laclo Administrative Post
 Suco Hohorai
 Suco Licore
 Suco Lacumesac
 Suco Uma Caduac
 Suco Uma Naruc
 Laclubar Administrative Post
 Suco Batara
 Suco Fatumakerek
 Suco Funar
 Suco Manelima
 Suco Orlalan
 Suco Sananain
 Laleia Subdistrict
 Suco Cairui
 Suco Hatularan
 Suco Lifau
 Manatuto Administrative Post
 Suco Ailili
 Suco Aiteas
 Suco Cribas
 Suco Iliheu
 Suco Maabat
 Suco Sau
 Soibada Administrative Post
 Suco Fatumakerek
 Suco Leohat
 Suco Manlala
 Suco Maunfahe
 Suco Samoro

Manufahi Municipality

 Alas Administrative Post
 Suco Aituha
 Suco Dotik
 Suco Malagidan
 Suco Taitudal
 Suco Uma Berloik
 Fatuberliu Administrative Post
 Suco Bubususu
 Suco Fatukahi
 Suco Kaikasa
 Suco Klakuk
 Suco Talinehar
 Same Administrative Post
 Suco Babulu
 Suco Betano
 Suco Daisula
 Suco Gratu
 Suco Holarua
 Suco Letefoho
 Suco Rotutu
 Suco Tutuluro
 Turiscai Administrative Post
 Suco Aitenua
 Suco Beremana
 Suco Fatukalo
 Suco Kaimauk
 Suco Foholau
 Suco Lesuata
 Suco Liurai
 Suco Manumera
 Suco Matorek
 Suco Mindelo
 Suco Orana

Oecusse (Special Administrative Region Oecusse-Ambeno)

 Nitibe Administrative Post
 Suco Banafi
 Suco Bebe Ufe
 Suco Lela Ufe
 Suco Suni Ufe
 Suco Usi Taco
 Oesilo Administrative Post
 Suco Bobometo
 Suco Usitakeno
 Suco Usitasae
 Pante Macassar Administrative Post
 Suco Bobocasae
 Suco Costa
 Suco Cunha
 Suco Lalisuk
 Suco Lifau
 Suco Naimeco
 Suco Nipane
 Suco Taiboco
 Passabe Administrative Post
 Suco Abani
 Suco Malelat

Viqueque Municipality

 Lacluta Administrative Post
 Suco Ahic
 Suco Dilor
 Suco Laline
 Suco Uma Tolu
 Ossu Administrative Post
 Suco Builale
 Suco Builo
 Suco Liaruca
 Suco Loi-Huno
 Suco Nahareca
 Suco Ossorua
 Suco Ossu de Cima
 Suco Uabubo
 Suco Uaguia
 Suco Uaibobo
 Uato-Lari Administrative Post
 Suco Afaloicai
 Suco Babulo
 Suco Macadique
 Suco Matohoi
 Suco Uaitame
 Suco Vessoru
 Uatucarbau Administrative Post
 Suco Afaloicai
 Suco Bahatata
 Suco Irabin de Baixo
 Suco Irabin de Cima
 Suco Loi Ulu
 Suco Uani Uma
 Viqueque Administrative Post
 Suco Bahalarauain
 Suco Bibileo
 Suco Caraubalu
 Suco Fatu Dere
 Suco Luca
 Suco Maluru
 Suco Uaimori
 Suco Uma Qui’ic
 Suco Uma Uain Craic
 Suco Uma Uain Leten

See also
 Municipalities of East Timor
 Administrative posts of East Timor

Citations

Sources
 Geographic Maps of UNMIT

 
Subdivisions of East Timor
East Timor, Sucos
East Timor 3
Sucos, East Timor
East Timor geography-related lists